Typhina nitens is a species of sea snail, a marine gastropod mollusk in the family Muricidae, the murex snails or rock snails.

Description
The length of the shell attains .

Distribution
This marine species occurs off the Philippines and in the Makassar Strait.

References

 Houart, R, Buge, B. & Zuccon, D. (2021). A taxonomic update of the Typhinae (Gastropoda: Muricidae) with a review of New Caledonia species and the description of new species from New Caledonia, the South China Sea and Western Australia. Journal of Conchology. 44(2): 103–147.

External links
 Hinds, R. B. (1843). (Descriptions of new species of shells collected by Sir Edward Belcher during the voyage of HMS Sulphur). Proceedings of the Zoological Society of London. (1843) 11: 17–19

Typhina
Gastropods described in 1843